Joséphine de La Baume (born 8 October 1984) is a French actress, singer, film director, and model. In 2018, she started the rock and garage group Film Noir.

Career
In 2010 she worked with Romain Gavras on his debut film Our Day will come and later was cast in Bertrand Tavernier's The Princess of Montpensier, selected in the main competition of Cannes Film Festival 2011. She then started working in the UK on features such as One Day by Lone Scherfig, Johnny English Reborn by Oliver Parker, Titanic written for ITV by Julian Fellowes, Mr Selfridges and Ron Howard's Rush.
From 2012, she started working in the US on projects such as Kiss of The Damned directed by Xan Cassavetes and Listen Up Philip directed by Alex Ross Perry.

Most recently, she appeared in Abner Pastoll's Road Games (Fausse Route) in which Dread Central described her as "sultry and enigmatic." The film was released theatrically in the US by IFC Films.

Singtank
De La Baume is a member of French indie band Singtank, with her brother Alexandre de la Baume and drummer Alberto Cabrera. Their debut album In Wonder was a critical success.

Film Noir
Founded by Josephine in 2018, Film Noir released their first EP titled Vertiges (Men of Glory) in 2019, which was well received.
The first single La Mariée (vague à l'âme) got into the France Inter Radio summer playlist. The second single Brûlant also got on the France Inter radio playlist. Film Noir collaborated on their EP with Cundo Bermudez (Ty Segall, No Age), Cole Alexander and Zumi Rosow (Black Lips), Kirin J Callinan and Samy Osta (Juniore, La Femme), and Sacha Got (La Femme).

Personal life
De La Baume married English DJ Mark Ronson on 3 September 2011. On 21 April 2017, she separated from Ronson. The divorce was finalised in October 2018.

Filmography
2010: The Princess of Montpensier by Bertrand Tavernier
2010: Our Day Will Come by Romain Gavras
2011: One Day  by Lone Scherfig
2011: Johnny English Reborn by Oliver Parker
2012: Confession of a Child of the Century by Sylvie Verheyde
2012: Kiss of the Damned by Alexandra Cassavetes
2013: Rush by Ron Howard
2013: Quai d'Orsay
2013: Joy de V.
2014: If You Don't, I Will
2014: Listen Up Philip
2015: Eva & Leon
2015: Road Games
2016: Ma vie criminelle
2017: Madame
2017: Hitman & Bodyguard
2017: Bees Make Honey
2018: A Very Secret Service
2018: Alien Crystal Palace
2018: L'Amour est une fête
2019: Femme Enfant
2019: Why not Choose Love: A Mary Pickford Manifesto
2020: Waiting for Anya
2021: Madame Claude

References

External links

1984 births
Living people
French female models
Actresses from Paris
French film actresses
French people of Swiss descent
French people of Jewish descent
French television actresses
Singers from Paris
21st-century French actresses
21st-century French singers
21st-century French women singers